Rudolph is an unincorporated community and census-designated place (CDP) in eastern Liberty Township, Wood County, Ohio, United States. As of the 2010 census, it had a population of 458. It has a post office with the ZIP code 43462.

History
Rudolph was originally called Mercers, and under the latter was platted in 1890 and named for Daniel Mercer, proprietor. A post office called Rudolph has been in operation since 1891. The present name honors H. J. Rudolph, a town merchant.

The post office in Rudolph has been offering a special Christmas postmark since 1990. According to the Toledo Blade in 2014, "Charlotte Lamb, the officer in charge at the Rudolph post office... estimates between 75,000 and 100,000 parcels come through the office every year.".

Geography

Rudolph is connected to Bowling Green and North Baltimore by the Slippery Elm Trail.

Demographics

References

Census-designated places in Wood County, Ohio